Folsom Falls is a small waterfall located on the Cimarron River in Union County in northeastern New Mexico, east of the city of Raton.  It is about 3 miles northeast of the town of Folsom, New Mexico, along New Mexico State Highway 456.

References

Landforms of Union County, New Mexico
Waterfalls of New Mexico
Plunge waterfalls